
Heshan may refer to the following places in China:

County-level 
 Heshan, Guangdong, county-level city of Jiangmen
 Heshan, Guangxi, county-level city of Laibin
 Heshan District, Hebi, Henan
 Heshan District, Yiyang, Hunan

Towns 
 , Guangdong
 , Shandong
 , in Donggang District, Rizhao, Shandong
 , Zhejiang

Subdistricts 
 Heshan Subdistrict, Yiyang, a subdistrict of Heshan District, Yiyang, Hunan
 , a subdistrict of Huli District in Xiamen, Fujian
 , a subdistrict in Pujiang County, Sichuan

Village 
 Heshan, Liuji, Liuji, Dawu County, Xiaogan, Hubei